"Why is there anything at all?" (or "why is there something rather than nothing?") is a question about the reason for basic existence which has been raised or commented on by a range of philosophers and physicists, including Gottfried Wilhelm Leibniz, Ludwig Wittgenstein, and Martin Heidegger, the last of whom called it "the fundamental question of metaphysics".

The question is posed totally and comprehensively rather than concerning reasoning for the existence of anything specific, such as the universe or multiverse, the Big Bang, God, mathematical and physical laws, time or consciousness. It can be seen as an open metaphysical question, rather than a search for an exact answer.

On causation
The ancient Greek philosopher Aristotle argued that everything in the universe must have a cause, culminating in an ultimate uncaused cause. (See Four causes)

Bertrand Russell took a "brute fact" position when he said, "I should say that the universe is just there, and that's all."

Philosopher Brian Leftow has argued that the question cannot have a causal explanation (as any cause must itself have a cause) or a contingent explanation (as the factors giving the contingency must pre-exist), and that if there is an answer it must be something that exists necessarily (i.e., something that just exists, rather than is caused).

Philosopher William Free argues that the only two options which can explain existence is that things either always existed or spontaneously emerged. In either scenario, existence is a fact for which there isn't a cause.

Arguments that there may be no need for causation
David Hume argued that a cause may not be necessary in the case of the formation of the universe. Whilst we demand that everything have a cause because of our experience of the necessity of causes, the formation of the universe is outside our experience and may be subject to different rules.

Criticism of the question
Philosopher Stephen Law has said the question may not need answering, as it is attempting to answer a question that is outside a spatio-temporal setting, from within a spatio-temporal setting. He compares the question to asking "what is north of the North Pole?"

Noted philosophical wit Sidney Morgenbesser answered the question with an apothegm: "If there were nothing you'd still be complaining!", or "Even if there was nothing, you still wouldn't be satisfied!"

Mathematical necessity
Gottfried Wilhelm Leibniz wrote:

Philosopher of physics Dean Rickles has argued that numbers and mathematics (or their underlying laws) may necessarily exist.

Physicist Max Tegmark wrote about the mathematical universe hypothesis, which states that all mathematical structures exist physically, and the physical universe is one of these structures. According to the hypothesis, the universe appears fine-tuned for intelligent life because of the anthropic principle, with most universes being devoid of life.

Physics
Physicists such as Stephen Hawking and Lawrence Krauss have offered explanations that rely on quantum mechanics, saying that in a quantum vacuum state, virtual particles and spacetime bubbles will spontaneously come into existence. A potential mathematical proof for this has been developed by the Chinese physicists Dongshan He, Dongfeng Gao, and Qing-yu Cai.

Nobel Laureate Frank Wilczek is credited with the aphorism that "nothing is unstable." However, physicist Sean Carroll argues that Wilczek's aphorism accounts merely for the existence of matter, but not the existence of quantum states, space-time, or the universe as a whole. Carroll concludes, as did Bertrand Russell, that "any attempt to account for the existence of something rather than nothing must ultimately bottom out in a set of brute facts; the universe simply is, without ultimate cause or explanation."

God
Gottfried Wilhelm Leibniz attributed to God as being the necessary sufficient reason for everything that exists (see: Cosmological argument). He wrote:"Why is there something rather than nothing? The sufficient reason... is found in a substance which... is a necessary being bearing the reason for its existence within itself."Philosopher Roy Sorensen writes in the Stanford Encyclopedia of Philosophy that to many philosophers the question is intrinsically impossible to answer, like squaring a circle, and even God does not sufficiently answer it:

Argument that "nothing" is impossible
The pre-Socratic philosopher Parmenides was one of the first Western thinkers to question the possibility of nothing. Many other thinkers, such as Bede Rundle, have questioned whether nothing is an ontological possibility. It can be argued that nothingness is an impossibility as there is already an existence.

Non-existence
The contemporary philosopher Roy Sorensen has argued that curiosity is possible "even when the proposition is known to be a necessary truth." For instance, a "reductio ad absurdum proof that 1 − 1/3 + 1/5 − 1/7 + … converges to π/4" demonstrates that not converging to π/4 is impossible. However, it provides no insight into why not converging to π/4 is impossible. Similarly, it's legitimate to ask why non-existence or "nothingness" is impossible, even if that is the case.

Philosophical Explanations 
Robert Nozick outlined in the second chapter of his Philosophical Explanations the following possible answers to the question:

 Self-Subsumption: "a law that applies to itself, and hence explains its own truth."
 The Nothingness Force: "the nothingness force acts on itself, it sucks nothingness into nothingness and produces something."
 The Principle of Indifference: establishes that nothing is a possibility among the n possibilities of having something. Then "the probability that there is something is n/(n +1) if n is finite and 1 if n is infinite."
 Fecundity: "Every possibility—including the possibility that there is nothing—exists in its own independent noninteracting realm."

See also

References

Further reading

External links
 Why Anything at All?, Closer to Truth
 Why is there something rather than nothing?, Stanford Encyclopedia of Philosophy

History of philosophy
Metaphysical theories
Philosophical problems
Possibility
Thought experiments